Hugo Salus (3 August 1866 in Česká Lípa – 4 February 1929 in Prague) was a Bohemian doctor, writer and poet.

Life 

Salus studied medicine in Prague and established a practice in gynaecology there from 1895 onwards. Apart from his professional activities as a doctor, he published numerous volumes of poetry and short stories, and was one of the more important exponents of  German-Jewish literature in the Prague of his day, moving in a circle which included younger figures of the stature of Franz Kafka, Max Brod, Franz Werfel, Egon Erwin Kisch, Oskar Baum, Johannes Urzidil, Paul Kornfeld, Ernst Weiss and Kamil Hoffmann. Several of his works were illustrated by Heinrich Vogeler, while Arnold Schönberg set two of his poems to music.  A prolific author, he soon became 'the acknowledged arbiter of Prague literary taste', and 'the most respected Bohemian poet writing in German' at the time. An early friend and mentor of Rainer Maria Rilke, his verse had some influence on Rilke's early lyric style.

To some of his fellow Jewish intellectuals, he was regarded as an unadulterated "assimilationist," and "a militant protagonist of German liberalism and Jewish assimilation" whose attachment to Zionism was little more than a matter of embracing a fashionable trend (Mode-Zionismus). Lothar Kahn, on the other hand, says that while Salus was described by Max Brod as an unqualified assimilationist, "this may be an exaggeration, Salus did hope, all else failing, for full Jewish absorption into the host society."

Of both him and his rival Friedrich Adler, Kafka biographer Peter Mailloux says,  "their Jewishness existed in name only." The philosopher Emil Utitz put it a bit differently, "Both acknowledged Jews, they nevertheless felt themselves to be the authentic representatives of all Germans in Bohemia, as well as further afield.  Those Germans wanted little to do with Prague in any case, and least of all with its Jews.  But Salus and Adler were liberals of the old stamp."  Kahn notes that "Salus made use of Jewish folkways and observances in his poetry, plays, and occasional fiction."

Works (a selection)

Poems 

 Gedichte. 1898
 Neue Gedichte. 1899
 Ehefrühling. 1900
 Reigen. 1900
 Christa. Ein Evangelium der Schönheit. 1902
 Ernte. 1903
 Neue Garben. 1904
 Die Blumenschale. 1908
 Glockenklang. 1911
 Das neue Buch. 1919
 Klarer Klang. 1922
 Helle Träume. 1924
 Die Harfe Gottes. 1928

Prose 

 Novellen des Lyrikers. 1903
 Das blaue Fenster. 1906
 Trostbüchlein für Kinderlose. 1909
 Andersen-Kalender 1910 (12 Fairy tales)
 Schwache Helden. 1910
 Die Hochzeitsnacht. Die schwarzen Fahen. 1913
 Seelen und Sinne. 1913
 Nachdenkliche Geschichten. 1914
 Der Heimatstein und andere Erzählungen. 1915
 Sommerabend. 1916
 Die schöne Barbara. 1919
 Freund Kafkus. 1919
 Der Beschau. Eine Ghettogeschichte. 1920
 Der Jungfernpreis. 1921
 Vergangenheit. 1921

Theatre 

 Susanna im Bade. 1901
 Römische Komödie. 1909

Secondary literature 

 Wertheimer, Paul: Hugo Salus, Prague 1902.
 Tinkl, Lotte: Neuromantische Elemente bei Hugo Salus und Franz Herold, Diss. Vienna, 1949.
 Franzel, Emil, 'Hugo Salus. Ein Stück versunkenes Prag,' in Sudetendeutscher Kulturalmanach, 7 (1969).
 Kletzander, Hermann, Hugo Salus und der Jugendstil, Diss. Salzburg 1977.
 Abret, Helga, 'Hugo Salus und Jaroslav Vrchlický. Das Verhältnis beider Dichter an Hand einiger unveröffentlichter Salus-Briefe,' in Österreich in Geschichte und Literatur, 24 (1980), pp. 28–34.
 Theopold, Wilhelm, Doktor und Poet dazu. Dichterärzte aus fünf Jahrhunderten, 2nd impression, Mainz 1987, .
 Jeremy Adler & Richard Fardon, 'An Oriental in the West: The Life of Franz Baermann Steiner,’ in Franz Baermann Steiner Selected Writings, vol.1, Taboo, truth, and religion, (eds. Jeremy Adler, Richard Fardon), Berghahn Books, 1999
 Lothar Kahn, Donald D. Hook, Between two worlds: a cultural history of German-Jewish writers, Iowa State University Press, 1993
 Natalie Berger, Where cultures meet: the story of the Jews of Czechoslovakia, Beth Hatefutsoth, Nahum Goldmann Museum of the Jewish Diaspora, 1990
 Marek Nekula, Walter Koschmal, Juden zwischen Deutschen und Tschechen: sprachliche und kulturelle Identitäten in Böhmen 1800–1945, Volume 104 of Veröffentlichungen des Collegium Carolinum, Collegium Carolinum München, Oldenbourg Wissenschaftsverlag, 2006
 Peter Mailloux, A Hesitation Before Birth:The Life of Franz Kafka, University of Delaware Press, 1989
 Livia Rothkirchen, The Jews of Bohemia and Moravia: facing the Holocaust, University of Nebraska Press, 2005

Footnotes

References

External links 

 
 
 
 
 Hugo Salus in the Bibliotheca Augustana.
 Transkriptionen at ngiyaw eBooks – also Digitalisate at ngiyaw Sources.

1866 births
1929 deaths
19th-century Czech physicians
Czech gynaecologists
Czech poets
Czech male writers
Czech medical writers
Jewish scientists
German poets
Czech writers in German
Jewish poets
Czech Jews
Austro-Hungarian Jews
People from Česká Lípa
German male poets